Dendrolaelaps nostricornutus is a species of mite in the family Digamasellidae. It is found in Europe.

References

Digamasellidae
Articles created by Qbugbot
Animals described in 1982